Halbi may refer to:
 Halba people, a tribal community of India
 Halbi language, an Indo-Aryan language
 Ali Ibn Burhan-ud-din Halbi, author of the Sirat al-Halbiya